Take Off Your Colours is the debut studio album by English rock band You Me at Six, originally released on 6 October 2008 through Slam Dunk Records. After forming in 2004, they released an EP titled We Know What It Means to Be Alone in 2006, and went on a tour with Elliot Minor in support of the release. After releasing "Save It for the Bedroom" as a single to promote their tour, the band gained attention from both independent and major record labels.

Following their tour with Elliot Minor, the writing process for the new album began. Although all the music's writing was credited to the entire band, vocalist Josh Franceschi and guitarist Max Helyer were usually the biggest creative forces among the group, being responsible for songs' concepts. The album was recorded in two weeks at Outhouse Studios in Reading, Berkshire with producers Matt O'Grady and John Mitchell. The band's work resulted in Take Off Your Colours displaying a sound that most critics associated with pop punk, though this result was unintended. Specifically, the record was noted to sound similar to the work of Fall Out Boy, New Found Glory, and Panic! at the Disco.

"If I Were In Your Shoes", "Gossip", and "Jealous Minds Think Alike" were released as singles to promote the album, the latter of which became the band's first charting song. During the album's recording sessions, "Save It for the Bedroom" was re-recorded, and this version became the album's fourth single. Two more singles, "Finders Keepers" and "Kiss and Tell", later appeared on re-releases of the album. The latter four singles managed to chart, and the album itself peaked at number 25 on the UK Albums Chart. Take Off Your Colours was certified gold in the UK for shipments of 100,000 copies in July 2012.

Background
You Me at Six formed in Weybridge, Surrey in 2004. The band's line-up consisted of vocalist Josh Franceschi, guitarists Max Helyer and Chris Miller, bassist Matt Barnes, and drummer Joe Phillips. The group released an EP, We Know What It Means to Be Alone in 2006, after which, Phillips left the band. Dan Flint, a friend the band had gone to college with, was initially asked to fill in on drums for a tour. He ended up becoming Phillips' permanent replacement following the band's appearance at Slam Dunk Festival 2007. Ben Ray, who ran the festival, was interested in managing the band and putting out their music. They played a show at the Camden Underworld in London in June 2007; by this point, they had acquired a press agent and were starting to attract attention from people in the music industry. The band then released another EP later in 2007.

You Me at Six went on tour with Elliot Minor, during which both bands released singles. "Save It for the Bedroom" was released on 22 October 2007 through Slam Dunk Records, a label co-founded by the band with help from their manager and fans. The single featured "You've Made Your Made (So Sleep in It)" as the B-side, and both tracks would later appear on Take Off Your Colours. A music video for "Save It for the Bedroom" had been released a few days prior and was directed by Lawrence Hardy. The band's release sold more copies than Elliot Minor's single, which was released through a major label. This situation made it clear to the band that, according to Franceschi, "major labels are good but over the years they have totally lost touch of what sells." By this time, the group was in discussion with a range of independent and major labels.

Composition and recording
Following the Elliot Minor tour, the group began writing material for their debut album. In late November and early December, the band went on their first headlining tour of the UK, with support from Flood of Red. During the latter month, the band wrote further material. All of the songs on the album were written and arranged by themselves. Typically, Helyer or Franceschi would have an idea that the band would then flesh out together. Occasionally, the band would record demos and change sections of them. The band's sound was an attempt to emulate the sound of popular pop punk groups such as Fall Out Boy and Panic! at the Disco, which was noted by a reviewer at the time of the record's release. Flint said Franceschi sung about attending house parties, being young and flirting with girls.

The title, Take Off Your Colours, is a quote from a line by the orphan leader in the film The Warriors (1979). The album's sound has been described by critics as pop punk and emo pop. At the time, the group was listening to bands such as Blink-182, New Found Glory, and, according to Barnes, "all that sort of Drive-Thru scene." One of the members described it as "a mixture of genres. Some songs are pop punk and some are rockier and heavier." The group did not intentionally compose a pop punk album but "it just sort of came [out] like that," according to Barnes. The band gauged the reaction to the new material by playing the songs live. You Me at Six performed at Reading Festival 2008, and the audience was larger than their tent's capacity.

The band began recording in spring 2008 at Outhouse Studios in Reading, Berkshire over the course of two weeks. Matt O'Grady and John Mitchell handled producer duties, with Mitchell also mixing the proceedings, while Tim Turan mastered the album. The band were in awe of O'Grady as they were fans of his band Fastlane. O'Grady encouraged Franceschi's vocal performance, as Flint explained: "Getting into the studio was very daunting for all of us, and Matt gave him the confidence to express how he felt, to know that he really could sing." Helyer said as they only used one amplifier, the guitar tone remained the same throughout the album. "Save It for the Bedroom" and "You've Made Your Bed (So Sleep in It)", which were initially released as a single in 2007, were re-recorded during the album's studio sessions. Franceschi's sister Elissa provided additional vocals on "Always Attract".

Release and touring

A music video was released for "If I Were in Your Shoes" on 14 February 2008, while it was officially announced as single on 17 March through Slam Dunk, with "Taste" as the B-side. During the previous month, the band also supported The Audition during their headlining tour of the UK. On 26 June, it was announced the band had signed a one-album contract with Slam Dunk. Franceschi explained that if the group wished to move to a bigger label, they "can easily move on [or] if we are happy we [will] stay [on Slam Dunk]". "Gossip" was released as the second single, with "All Your Fault" as the B-side, on 28 July 2008. A music video for the song was also released. On 11 August of the same year, the band released "If You Run" as a free download from their website.

On 11 September 2008, a music video was released for "Jealous Minds Think Alike", which was directed by Shane Davey. The song was released as a single on 29 September, with "Blue Eyes Don't Lie" as the B-side. It was the band's first single to chart, peaking at number 100 on the UK Singles Chart in November. The album, Take Off Your Colours was released on 6 October 2008 through Slam Dunk. The band did a series of in-store performances to help promote the release. Later in the month, the band toured in the United Kingdom with support from Houston Calls and Farewell. On 19 February 2009, the band released a second music video for "Save It for the Bedroom", which was directed by Davey. The video was inspired by The Jeremy Kyle Show, with the band appearing as guests on the fictional Lazarus Ironside show. The show's host was played by actor Joerg Stadler. In March, the band went on another tour of the UK. "Save It for the Bedroom" was released as a single on 9 March.

The band also announced that they had signed to Epitaph Records on 10 March 2009. Following a premier on BBC Radio 1 on April 6, "Finders Keepers" was released as a single to precede the album on 25 May. The band were excited about working with the label, as they knew Epitaph for helping other acts reach the main stage of Warped Tour and be able to tour internationally. Franceschi later recounted that they "never really saw any of that, they practically did nothing for us, fucking nothing whatsoever," concluding that he never even met the label's founder Brett Gurewitz. Following this, the band headlined the Slam Dunk Festival, and performed at the Download and GuilFest festivals. Epitaph made Take Off Your Colours available for streaming on 16 July, ahead of its US release on 21 July. As well as studio and acoustic versions of "Finders Keepers", this version featured several bonus tracks: an acoustic version of "Save It for the Bedroom", the B-sides to "Gossip", "Jealous Minds Think Alike", and re-recorded "Save It for the Bedroom" singles. The US iTunes version of Take Off Your Colours also includes "Kiss and Tell", a song which would later be released as a single to promote a UK limited edition of the album.

In August, the band went on the Warped Tour and performed at the Reading and Leeds Festivals. In early September, the band did some small, intimate club shows in the UK. "Kiss and Tell" was released as a single on 7 September 2009, a week before the limited edition of Take Off Your Colours was released in the UK. In addition to "Kiss and Tell", it features the original album on one disc and another disc of additional songs: "Finders Keepers", and B-sides to the "Gossip", "Jealous Minds Think Alike", and re-recorded "Save It for the Bedroom" singles. Between September and November, the band performed with The Academy Is..., Mayday Parade, Set Your Goals and The Secret Handshake in the US on the AP Fall Ball Tour.

By November 2009, Franceschi described playing the material live as having "become suffocated almost and we've really overplayed some of them". Prior to Slam Dunk Festival 2015, there were rumours that the band was going to perform Take Off Your Colours in its entirety. Franceschi later explained the band would be "extensively paying homage to that with songs" from the album. In 2021, Franceschi ranked Take Off Your Colours as his least favourite You Me at Six album, stating that it had a "lot of heart and teen angst on that album which I don’t think we could truly do again even if we tried".

Tenth anniversary
To celebrate the album's tenth anniversary, the band added three shows to their 2018 UK tour in support of their sixth album VI. The band announced they would perform Take Off Your Colours in its entirety after the initial show at a given venue for VI on select dates. They played these special performances on 24 November at Manchester's Victoria Warehouse, 28 November at Glasgow's Barrowland Ballroom, and 2 December at London's O2 Brixton Academy. While promoting these shows and celebrating the record's tenth anniversary, they were also featured on the November issue of Rock Sound; included with its special edition were poster prints that were hand-signed by the band, a 16-page photo collection from the Take Off Your Colours era, and other bonus material. Prior to these anniversary shows, "Call That a Comeback" had never been performed live. "Gossip" and "Nasty Habits" had also been among the first of the band's songs to be retired from their setlists.

Reception

Critical reception
Reviews for the album were generally positive. Alter the Press! reviewer Sean Reid said the album showed the band had "potential to reach the level of success as bands such as Fall Out Boy and Panic At The Disco." Jen Walker of Big Cheese called the album "a refreshing English pop punk debut", which contained "clear musical influences" from New Found Glory, Panic! at the Disco, and Brand New. Strange Glue reviewer Aidan Williamson praised the album's hooks. The Guardian described the band's sound to be "the UK's answer to Fall Out Boy," with reviewer Emma Johnston choosing "Jealous Minds Think Alike" as a highlight.

In a lukewarm review, Alternative Addiction described the album as such: "Think Fallout Boy  meets New Found Glory and you won’t be far off getting what makes You Me At Six tick. ‘Gossip’ and opener ‘The Truth Is A Terrible Thing’ all echo the aforementioned bands, however there is a rough edge that separates You Me At Six from their glossy luminaries." They praised the simple production on the record which retained their distinctly British sound, and concluded, "A happy medium has been reached with an Americanized sound that retains some of the bands gritty origins." Evan Lucy of Alternative Press also gave the album a mixed review, commenting that "some songs feel ripped from Fall Out Boy's Take This to Your Grave," but praised songs which were less adherent to pop punk, namely "Tigers and Sharks" and "Always Attract".

Thrash Hits reviewer Mischa Pearlman heavily criticised the album, calling the music on the record "a series of badly phrased platitudes set to irritating tunes", and attacking the band as "most definitely a product of their times [...] You Me At Six are the perfect poster boys for their so-called scene." AllMusic reviewer Jon O'Brien also criticised the album's sound, describing it as an album which was more mature than a Busted record, but not as heavy as Fightstar's music. O'Brien stated that the band followed a "well-worn formula" of emo pop on Take Off Your Colours. However, another AllMusic reviewer, Jason Birchmeier, later regarded Take Off Your Colours as an "impressive debut album" which cemented the group "as one of England's hottest up-and-coming rock bands".

Commercial performance and legacy
The album peaked on the UK Albums Chart at number 25, and the deluxe edition re-entered the chart, peaking at number 61. While "If I Were In Your Shoes" and "Gossip" failed to chart, "Jealous Minds Think Alike" peaked at number 100 and "Save It For the Bedroom" peaked at number 146. While promoting the deluxe version of the album, "Finders Keepers" and "Kiss and Tell" reached number 33 and 42, respectively. In March 2012, the album was certified silver in the UK, and four months later, it was certified gold. Rock Sound ranked it at number 36 on their list of the year's best albums. Rock Sound writer Rob Sayce said the album's "unprecedented success helped open doors for other rising bands" in the UK, such as Deaf Havana and Young Guns.

Track listing
All songs written and arranged by You Me at Six.

Personnel
Personnel per booklet.

You Me at Six
Josh Franceschilead vocals
Chris Millerguitar
Max Helyerguitar
Matt Barnesbass guitar
Dan Flintdrums, percussion

Additional musicians
Elissa Franceschi – guest vocals on "Always Attract"

Production
 Matt O'Gradyproducer
 John Mitchellco-producer, mixing
 Tim Turanmastering
 Tom Barnesphotography
 John Lathamartwork, design
 Ben RayA&R
 Alistair TantA&R

Chart positions and certifications

Peak positions
Original release

Reissue

Certifications

References 
Citations

Sources

 
 
 
 
 
 
 

2008 debut albums
You Me at Six albums
Epitaph Records albums
Virgin Records albums
Emo pop albums